Deutsche Schule Sofia is a German international school in Sofia, Bulgaria. It serves vorschule (nursery), grundschule (primary school), and gymnasium.

References

External links
  Deutsche Schule Sofia
  Deutsche Schule Sofia
  Deutsche Schule Sofia (old website)

Sofia
International Baccalaureate schools in Bulgaria
International schools in Sofia
Bulgaria–Germany relations